Marani may refer to:

People
 Diego Marani, Italian writer and EU-policy advisor and translator
 Manuel Marani (born 1984), Sammarinese international footballer
 Mauro Marani (born 1975), Sammarinese international footballer
 Michele Marani (born 1982), Sammarinese international footballer
 Rosanna Marani (born 1946), Italian journalist and television presenter

Other
 marani, Georgian word for winery
 Marani, Georgia, a village in Abasha District, Georgia
 Marani, Iran, a village in Namin County, Iran
 Mirani, Iran, a village in Ardabil County, Iran
 21306 Marani, an asteroid

Italian-language surnames